John Joe Flood, also referred to as Jonjo Flood or John Flood, was an Irish footballer who played as a forward for Shelbourne, Shamrock Rovers, Leeds United and Crystal Palace. As an international, he also played for and captained the Irish Free State yielding an impressive return of 4 goals in 5 games. Flood was also part of the League of Ireland XI setup (1925–1933) which was viewed by fans of the day as an international team when playing against the likes of the Scottish/Welsh/IFA League XI sides. He played eight times and scored 3 goals.

Club career
Flood play for Shelbourne before joining Shamrock Rovers. After helping Rovers win their first ever League of Ireland title in 1923 he joined Leeds United, together with Bob Fullam. However neither of them managed to establish themselves at United and they both rejoined Rovers for the following season. Back with Rovers, together with Fullam, John Fagan and Billy Farrell he was an integral part of a legendary forward-line known as the Four F's. During the 1924–25 season they helped Rovers win a League of Ireland / League of Ireland Shield / FAI Cup treble. They won the FAI Cup after beating Shelbourne 2–1 at Dalymount Park before an attendance of 25,000. Flood and Fullam scored the two goals against their former club. During his career Flood also had a spell with Crystal Palace. In April 1932 he was awarded a benefit game which broke all previous attendance records and signified the impact that the popular Flood had on the game in the country at the time.

Irish international
Between 1926 and 1931 Flood made 5 appearances and scored 4 goals for the Irish Free State. He made his international debut in a 3–0 away defeat against Italy on 21 March 1926. He won his second cap on 20 April 1929 against Belgium at Dalymount Park. He marked the occasion by scoring Irelands' first international hat-trick and the Irish won 4–0. He scored his fourth international goal in a return game against Belgium on 11 May 1930. Jimmy Dunne scored the other two goals as the Irish won 3–1. On 26 April 1931 he captained the Irish Free State against Spain. Together with Tom Farquharson, Peter Kavanagh and Paddy Moore he was part of a team that gained a respectable 1–1 draw at the Montjuic Stadium in Barcelona. Flood laid on the pass for Moore to score on his debut. He made his last international appearance on 13 December 1931 in the return game against Spain which the Irish Free State lost 5–0. Flood captained the Irish team on that day.

Honours
Shamrock Rovers:

League of Ireland: 4
1922–23, 1924–25, 1926–27, 1930–31
FAI Cup: 6
1925, 1929, 1930, 1931, 1932, 1933
League of Ireland Shield
Winners 1924–25, 1926–27, 1931–32: 4
Leinster Senior Cup
Winners 1923, 1927, 1929, 1930: 4
Leinster Senior League
Winners 1921–22: 1

References

Sources
The Hoops by Paul Doolan and Robert Goggins

External links
Remembering John Joe Flood

Republic of Ireland association footballers
Irish Free State international footballers
League of Ireland players
Shamrock Rovers F.C. players
Shelbourne F.C. players
Leeds United F.C. players
Crystal Palace F.C. players
League of Ireland XI players
Irish Free State association footballers
Leinster Senior League (association football) players
Association football forwards
1899 births
1982 deaths